Nore Neset Church is a parish church of the Church of Norway in Bjørnafjorden Municipality in Vestland county, Norway. It is located in the village of Hagavik, just west of the municipal centre of Osøyro. It is one of the two churches for the Os parish which is part of the Fana prosti (deanery) in the Diocese of Bjørgvin. The brown, brick church was built in a fan-shaped design in 2000 using plans drawn up by the architects Mette and Morten Molden. The church seats about 200 people.

History
During the 1990s, plans were made for a new church in Hagavik. The architects Mette and Morten Molden designed the new building. The brick church building itself is almost square and has lower extensions to the east and south as well as a free-standing, asymmetrically placed bell tower. The church was consecrated on 1 December 2000.

See also
List of churches in Bjørgvin

References

Bjørnafjorden
Churches in Vestland
Fan-shaped churches in Norway
Brick churches in Norway
21st-century Church of Norway church buildings
Churches completed in 2000
2000 establishments in Norway